Georg Loisel (born 1 June 1957) is an Austrian fencer. He competed in the team foil event at the 1984 Summer Olympics. His father, Hubert Loisel, also fenced at the Olympics for Austria.

References

1957 births
Living people
Austrian male fencers
Austrian foil fencers
Olympic fencers of Austria
Fencers at the 1984 Summer Olympics